Traversal may refer to:

 Graph traversal, checking and/or changing each vertex in a graph
 Tree traversal, checking and/or changing each node in a tree data structure
 NAT traversal, establishing and maintaining Internet protocol connections in a computer network, across gateways that implement network address translation

See also
 Traverse (disambiguation)